Tobias Wächter (born ) is a German track cyclist. He competed in the keirin event at the 2014 UCI Track Cycling World Championships.

References

External links
 
 

1988 births
Living people
German track cyclists
German male cyclists
Place of birth missing (living people)
Sportspeople from Düsseldorf
Cyclists from North Rhine-Westphalia